Toru Tanzawa from Micron Technology, Inc., Tokyo, Japan was named Fellow of the Institute of Electrical and Electronics Engineers (IEEE) in 2016 for contributions to integrated high-voltage circuits.

References

Fellow Members of the IEEE
Living people
Year of birth missing (living people)
Place of birth missing (living people)